Harbor Club Condominiums is a high-rise residential building in San Diego, California, United States composed of two towers of equal height. Located in the Marina district of Downtown San Diego, Harbor Club was designed by architects BPA Architecture Planning Interiors. The condos are located near the San Diego Convention Center and Petco Park. The towers are currently the tenth-tallest buildings in San Diego.

History
Construction of the towers was completed in 1992 at a cost of $96 million.

See also
List of tallest buildings in San Diego

References

External links 
Harbor Club Condominiums: East Tower and West Tower at Emporis.com
East Tower and West Tower at SkyscraperPage.com

Residential buildings completed in 1992
Residential skyscrapers in San Diego
Twin towers